De Renzie James Brett (11 April 1809 – 16 June 1889) was a soldier, farmer and politician. He was a member of the New Zealand Legislative Council.

Brett was born at Wexford, County Wexford, Ireland, in 1809. Together with his family, he came to New Zealand on the Greyhound in May 1865. He represented the Selwyn electorate on the 6th Canterbury Provincial Council from 1870 to 1874.  He was appointed to the Legislative Council on 3 July 1871 and served until his death on 16 June 1889 at Christchurch.

Brett is notable for having brought irrigation to inland Canterbury.  He named his farm Kirwee and the township of that name developed around it.  He is buried at Linwood Cemetery.

Notes

References

1809 births
1889 deaths
19th-century Irish people
Members of the New Zealand Legislative Council
Burials at Linwood Cemetery, Christchurch
New Zealand farmers
Politicians from County Wexford
Irish emigrants to New Zealand (before 1923)
19th-century New Zealand politicians